WMFD (630 kHz) is a commercial AM radio station in Wilmington, North Carolina. It is owned by the Capitol Broadcasting Company and broadcasts a sports format, primarily from ESPN Radio.  The radio studios and offices are on North Kerr Avenue in Wilmington.  The radio station carries the games of the Cape Fear Rugby Football Club.

By day, WMFD’s power is 800 watts; at night it slightly increases its power to 1,000 watts.  A directional antenna with a three-tower array is used at all times to protect other stations on 630 AM from interference.  The transmitter is off Sampson Street in Navassa, North Carolina.  Programming is simulcast on 250-watt FM translator W269DF at 101.7 MHz.  WMFD is also heard on the HD Radio digital subchannel of co-owned 99.9 WKXB-HD3.

History
It is Wilmington's oldest, though not its first, radio station. It has retained its original call sign throughout its history.

In 1954, the station launched WMFD-TV Channel 6, Wilmington's first TV station, now WECT.

In May 1996, Community Broadcasting sold radio stations WMFD, WUOY, and WBMS to a new company called Ocean Broadcasting.  As a talk station, WMFD added Dr. Laura Schlessinger and The Fabulous Sports Babe, as well as CNN Headline News part of the time.  In 1999, WMFD was airing Don Imus' morning show from New York City.

In 2000, WMFD changed to sports radio and added the minor-league baseball team Wilmington Waves.

In July 2004, NextMedia Group purchased WRQR, WAZO, and WMFD from Ocean Broadcasting, and WKXB and WSFM from Sea-Comm Inc.

In July 2008, Capitol Broadcasting announced its purchase of NextMedia's Wilmington stations.

Translator
In addition to the main station, WMFD is relayed by FM translator W269DF 101.7 to widen its broadcast area. This station rebroadcast WLTT prior to 2014.

References

External links
Official Website
ESPN-WMFD-959FM-and-AM630 facebook

FCC History Cards for WMFD (covering 1934-1981)

MFD
ESPN Radio stations
Radio stations established in 1935
Sports in Wilmington, North Carolina